is a Japanese football player who plays as a Midfielder and currently play for Matsumoto Yamaga, on loan from Shimizu S-Pulse.

Career
Yuta Taki joined J1 League club Shimizu S-Pulse in 2018 after graduation at academy team in 2017. Taki was loaned to Kataller Toyama in 24 August 2020 and loaned again to Matsumoto Yamaga in 30 December 2022.

Career statistics

Club
Updated to the start of 2023 season.

References

External links
Profile at Shimizu S-Pulse
Profile at Matsumoto Yamaga FC

1999 births
Living people
Association football people from Shizuoka Prefecture
Japanese footballers
J1 League players
J3 League players
Shimizu S-Pulse players
Kataller Toyama players
Matsumoto Yamaga FC players
Association football midfielders